The NME Album of the Year & Single Of The Year was announced on 3 December 2013. It was the 40th countdown of the most popular albums and tracks of the year, as chosen by music reviewers and independent journalists who work for the magazine and for NME.com.

Albums

Bold: Album contains track that won Single of the Year

Countries represented
  - 23
  - 18
  - 3
  - 2
  - 1
  - 1
  - 1
  - 1

Singles

Artists with multiple entries

4 Entries:
 Kanye West (10, 18, 22, 36)

3 Entries:
 Arctic Monkeys (3, 29, 32)

2 Entries:
 Foals (8, 37)
 Queens of the Stone Age (16, 19)
 Vampire Weekend (24, 31)

Countries represented
  - 26
  - 16
  - 4
  - 2
  - 1
  - 1

References

New Musical Express
British music-related lists
2013 in British music